Prokne (minor planet designation: 194 Prokne) is a main-belt asteroid that was discovered by German-American astronomer C. H. F. Peters on March 21, 1879, in Clinton, New York, and named after Procne, the sister of Philomela in Greek mythology. Stellar occultations by Prokne have been observed twice, in 1984 from Italy and again in 1999 from Iowa (United States).

For comparison, observations by the IRAS observatory gave a diameter of 164 km. The spectrum matches a classification of a C-type asteroid, indicating it has a primitive carbonaceous composition. Judging from radar data, the near surface solid density of the asteroid is 3.6.

References

External links 
 
 

Background asteroids
Prokne
Prokne
C-type asteroids (Tholen)
C-type asteroids (SMASS)
18790321
Objects observed by stellar occultation